The Cape Verdean passport is issued to citizens of Cape Verde for international travel. Cape Verdean citizens can travel to member states of the Economic Community of West African States (ECOWAS) visa-free.

Physical properties
 Surname
 Given names
 Nationality Cape Verdean
 Date of birth 
 Sex  
 Place of birth  
 Date of Expiry 
 Passport number

Languages

The data page/information page is printed in Portuguese and English.

See also 
 ECOWAS passports
 Visa requirements for Cape Verdean citizens
 List of passports

References

Cape Verde
Government of Cape Verde